Paul Nguyễn Văn Bình (September 1, 1910 – July 1, 1995) was a Vietnamese prelate of the Catholic Church. He was the first Archbishop of Saigon (Ho Chi Minh City) from 1960 until his death in 1995.

Biography
Paul Bình was born on September 1, 1910, in Saigon, Vietnam. In 1922, he started to study at Sai Gon minor seminary. He was sent to Rome in 1932 to further his studies by Bishop Isidore-Marie-Joseph Dumortier, who was Vicar Apostolic of Saigon. He was ordained a priest on March 27, 1937, at the Archbasilica of St. John Lateran in Rome. In 1943, he started teaching at the Saint Joseph Major Seminary in Saigon and was appointed as pastor of Cầu Đất parish in Da Lat in 1948.

On September 20, 1955, he was appointed as Vicar Apostolic of Can Tho by Pope Pius XII and was consecrated by Pierre-Martin Ngô Đình Thục, Vicar Apostolic of Vĩnh Long on November 30 the same year at the Notre-Dame Saigon Cathedral.

He was named the first Archbishop of Saigon (Ho Chi Minh City) on November 24, 1960, by Pope John XXIII.

On July 1, 1995, he died at the age of 84 and was buried at the Saint Joseph Major Seminary in Ho Chi Minh City.

See also 
Catholic Church in Vietnam

References

External links 
Catholic Hierarchy: Archbishop Paul Nguyễn Văn Bình 

1910 births
1995 deaths
People from Ho Chi Minh City
Bishops appointed by Pope Pius XII
20th-century Roman Catholic bishops in Vietnam